Ted Fordham (born 3 May 1940) is a former Australian rules footballer who played for Essendon in the Victorian Football League (VFL). He was the VFL's leading goalkicker in the 1966 season.

Debuting in 1961, Fordham played as a half-back flanker and follower during the early stages of his career. It was later in the 1964 season that he moved to full-forward, under the instruction of John Coleman. He helped Essendon win the premiership the following season with six goals in the preliminary final and then kicked a record-equalling seven goals in the grand final against St Kilda.

VFL statistics

|-
|- style="background-color: #EAEAEA"
! scope="row" style="text-align:center" | 1961
|style="text-align:center;"|
| 20 || 10 || 3 ||  ||  ||  ||  ||  ||  || 0.3 ||  ||  ||  ||  ||  || 
|-
! scope="row" style="text-align:center" | 1962
|style="text-align:center;"|
| 20 || 5 || 0 ||  ||  ||  ||  ||  ||  || 0.0 ||  ||  ||  ||  ||  || 
|- style="background-color: #EAEAEA"
! scope="row" style="text-align:center" | 1963
|style="text-align:center;"|
| 20 || 14 || 7 ||  ||  ||  ||  ||  ||  || 0.5 ||  ||  ||  ||  ||  || 
|-
! scope="row" style="text-align:center" | 1964
|style="text-align:center;"|
| 20 || 16 || 25 ||  ||  ||  ||  ||  ||  || 1.6 ||  ||  ||  ||  ||  || 
|- style="background-color: #EAEAEA"
! scope="row" style="text-align:center;" | 1965
|style="text-align:center;"|
| 20 || 20 || 54 || bgcolor="DD6E81"| 56 || 200 || 18 || 218 || 108 ||  || 2.7 || bgcolor="b7e718"| 2.8 || 10.0 || 0.9 || 10.9 || 5.4 || 
|-
! scope="row" style="text-align:center" | 1966
|style="text-align:center;"|
| 20 || 20 || bgcolor="DD6E81"| 76 || bgcolor="DD6E81"| 55 || 211 || 21 || 232 || 106 ||  || bgcolor="DD6E81"| 3.8 || 2.8 || 10.6 || 1.1 || 11.6 || 5.3 || 
|- style="background-color: #EAEAEA"
! scope="row" style="text-align:center" | 1967
|style="text-align:center;"|
| 20 || 15 || 25 || 30 || 162 || 20 || 182 || 79 ||  || 1.7 || 2.0 || 10.8 || 1.3 || 12.1 || 5.3 || 
|-
! scope="row" style="text-align:center" | 1968
|style="text-align:center;"|
| 20 || 22 || 22 || 20 || 350 || 75 || 425 || 132 ||  || 1.0 || 0.9 || 15.9 || 3.4 || 19.3 || 6.0 || 
|- style="background-color: #EAEAEA"
! scope="row" style="text-align:center" | 1969
|style="text-align:center;"|
| 20 || 6 || 2 || 5 || 75 || 20 || 95 || 27 ||  || 0.3 || 0.8 || 12.5 || 3.3 || 15.8 || 4.5 || 
|- class="sortbottom"
! colspan=3| Career
! 128
! 214
! 166
! 998
! 154
! 1152
! 452
! 
! 1.7
! 2.0
! 12.0
! 1.9
! 13.9
! 5.4
! 
|}

References

External links

Essendon Football Club profile

1940 births
Essendon Football Club players
Essendon Football Club Premiership players
Australian rules footballers from Victoria (Australia)
Coleman Medal winners
Living people
Place of birth missing (living people)
One-time VFL/AFL Premiership players